The women's 200 metre freestyle event at the 2016 Summer Olympics took place 8–9 August at the Olympic Aquatics Stadium.

Summary
After a world-record breaking victory in the 400 m freestyle two days earlier, U.S. distance ace Katie Ledecky pulled away from the field to capture the Olympic mid-distance freestyle crown and her second individual gold at these Games. Hanging with the leaders at the 150-metre turn, Ledecky fended off Sweden's Sarah Sjöström towards a gold-medal finish in 1:53.73. Despite trying to hold on Ledecky at the final lap, Sjöström was unable to catch her near the wall, and settled for the silver in 1:54.08. Meanwhile, Australia's Emma McKeon moved up from one of the outside lanes to take home the bronze in 1:54.92.

Italy's world-record holder Federica Pellegrini dropped off the podium for the second straight Olympics to fourth in 1:55.18, charging a 0.07-second edge ahead of China's Shen Duo and McKeon's countrywoman Bronte Barratt, bronze medalist from London 2012, both of whom shared the fifth-place time with a matching 1:55.25. Sjöström's teammate Michelle Coleman grabbed the penultimate spot of the top eight in 1:56.27, with France's Charlotte Bonnet (1:56.29) narrowly trailing her by 0.02 of a second to round out the field.

Notable swimmers missed the final roster, including four-time Olympic gold medalist Missy Franklin, who tied for thirteenth with Hong Kong's Siobhan Haughey (1:57.56) in the semifinals.

In the medal ceremony, the medals for the competition were presented by Franco Carraro, Italy, IOC member, and the gifts were presented by Paolo Barelli, Italy, Honorary Secretary of FINA.

Records
Prior to this competition, the existing world and Olympic records were as follows.

Competition format

The competition consisted of three rounds: heats, semifinals, and a final. The swimmers with the best 16 times in the heats advanced to the semifinals. The swimmers with the best 8 times in the semifinals advanced to the final. Swim-offs were used as necessary to break ties for advancement to the next round.

Results

Heats

Semifinals

Semifinal 1

Semifinal 2

Final

References

Women's 00200 metre freestyle
Olympics
2016 in women's swimming
Women's events at the 2016 Summer Olympics